The 1814 United States Senate special election in Pennsylvania was held February 24, 1814. Jonathan Roberts was elected by the Pennsylvania General Assembly to the United States Senate.

Background
The Democratic-Republican Michael Leib was elected to the United States Senate by the General Assembly, consisting of the House of Representatives and the Senate, in December 1808. Sen. Leib resigned on February 14, 1814, to become postmaster of Philadelphia.

Results
Following the resignation of Sen. Michael Leib, the Pennsylvania General Assembly convened on February 24, 1814, to elect a new Senator to fill the vacancy. The results of the vote of both houses combined are as follows:

|-
|-bgcolor="#EEEEEE"
| colspan="3" align="right" | Totals
| align="right" | 126
| align="right" | 100.00%
|}

See also 
 United States Senate elections, 1814 and 1815

References

External links
Pennsylvania Election Statistics: 1682-2006 from the Wilkes University Election Statistics Project

1814 special
Pennsylvania 1814
Pennsylvania special
United States Senate special
United States Senate 1814
Pennsylvania 1814